Björn Peter Pettersson (born 29 December 1957) is a retired Swedish swimmer who won a bronze medal in the 4 × 200 m freestyle relay at the 1974 European Aquatics Championships. Two years later at the 1976 Summer Olympics he finished seventh with the Swedish team in the same event.

References

1957 births
Swimmers at the 1976 Summer Olympics
Swedish male freestyle swimmers
Olympic swimmers of Sweden
Living people
European Aquatics Championships medalists in swimming